The Drak, Drâk, Dråk, Drakel or Fürdrak (either for-Drak or fire Drak), in Oldenburg also Drake (f.), is a household spirit from German folklore often identified with the Kobold or the devil (German Teufel), both of which are also used as synonymous terms for Drak. Otherwise it is also known as Drache (dragon) but has nothing much to do with the reptilian monster in general.

Names 
The Drak is known under various and often individual names. Some names given to the Drak hint at its elfish or Kobold descent, such as Alf, Alber, Alp, Alrun (mandrake), Kolbuck, Koberchen, Pûks, and Erdhühnlein (earth chicken). Names based on clothing are typical for both Drak and Kobold, e.g. Hauslätzchen (house bib), Rôdjackte  or Rodjackte (the one with the red jacket), Jackerl (the one with the jacket; a devil name), Langwams (long doublet), and Kortwämsken (little short doublet). Yet other names are rather proper names like they are also given to the Kobold or even the devil, such as Mårten (Martin), Mertche (diminutive of Martin), Lütche Ohle (little old one, a devil name), Steppchen, Steppken or Steffchen (devil names), Hänschen (Johnnie), and Federhänschen  (feather-Johnnie, another devil name).

Appearances 
The appearance of the Drak is very variable. Although humanoid shape is attested, as manikin, sometimes with a red cap and a red jacket, the Drak predominantly takes the shape of an animal. Especially frequently mentioned is the appearance of a cat or kitten, be it black or brown-black, even a so-called Teufelskatze (devil cat), or of a chicken (cock or hen) be it black or even wet. Such a Drachenhuhn (dragon chicken) is sometimes capable of laying Taler (thaler) or silver eggs, in the latter case two per day. Other attested bird shapes, besides bird in general, are the partridge, a gray hawk, an owl, and a jackdaw. The Drak might also appear as a (pied) calf, a (three-legged or fiery) hare, a wingless red snake, or a black ant. The Drak might take the shape of an animal by day and that of a 'Kobold by night, or it appears as a chicken inside the house and in fiery appearance outside of it.

Various fiery appearances are also typical for the Drak when it flies out at night. A shooting star, meteor, will-o'-the-wisp (German: Irrlicht) or lightning flash might thus very well be the Drak The fiery appearance of the Drak it too variable to describe exhaustingly, thus only a few examples shall suffice. It might appear as a fire column or fire pillar, as various objects with a fiery tail (a broom, a glowing ball, a star), as a fiery red lump, a firelight, a fiery grain sack, and quite frequently as a fiery boom (with a broad head, a big head like a stove pot, or surrounded by blue firelight). Other appearances are more like animals, such as a fiery snake, cat, or chicken, a being with a big fiery head and a long black-blue tail, and a being with a big dog head and a glowing snake tail. Where the Drak is flying everything burns down. Because of that it is regarded as an omen of firestorm. The Drak might also burn down its owner's house if it feels mistreated. Names associated with the Drak's fiery and tailed appearance are Herbrand (shooting star), Langschwanz (long tail), Kortschwanz (short tail), Schlingsteert (either gobble tail or entwining tail), Gluhswanz, Gluhstert  or Glüsteert (all: glowing tail), and Salamander. It further is accompanied by infernal sulfur stench.

 Owning a Drak 
To win a Drak as one's domestic spirit a deal with the devil signed with one's own blood is necessary, thus the owners are often said to be witches (German: Hexen, sg. Hexe) or freemasons (German: Freimaurer (sg., pl.)). What makes owning a Drak so desirable despite the price of one's soul is the fact that the Drak brings its owner whatever they might covet by stealing it from the neighbors. A Drak's owner is not allowed to pray or to go to church for communion. The Drak will take every third owner back to hell.

There are several types of Drak.

The first is the Gelddrache or money dragon which brings its owner money, gold and treasures, might also show where the latter are hidden. In accordance to both activity and appearance other names for the Drak are Geldhühndel (money chicken), Tragerl (carrier), and Stutzli (money). The money it brings can be spent but will return to the owner without fail. Owning a Drak can be bound to owning a specific Taler which will always return to its owner if not sold lower than its value. Otherwise it can only be inherited or given away as part of a dowry. Occasionally, such a Feuerpûz (fire bogey) might also be enclosed in a glass bottle. Owning a Drak makes the process of dying very difficult its owner. Placing the dying person on the dunghill or placing dung under the dying person's pillow is the only way to ease dying for a Drak owner. But even then the Drak might still scratch its owners face. Contrarily, a sudden death might also be the fate of a Drak owner, particularly as it kills its owner by various means if it believes its owner to live too long. People who get rich quickly are said to have a Drak The Drak brings its money load through the chimney or the skylight. Sometimes this load also can be horse dung turning into gold afterwards. The Drak carrying gold or money appears distinctly colored (red-hot, half red, half blue, blue generally or when carrying a particularly big amount, black or dazzlingly yellow) or flies particularly low. For this job the Drak expects to be well fed with millet gruel, though, to be placed on the stove the Drak dwells inside. If the feeding ceases, the Drak can't fulfill a task or its lair is discovered, then the Drak will escape never to return again. When the gruel is burnt, then the Drak rages in the stove so that it seems it would soon explode.

Another is the Getreidedrache, Korndrache or Weizendrache (crop dragon, grain dragon, and wheat dragon respectively) which is also known as Roggenkatze (rye cat). This kind of Drak accordingly brings its owner loads of cereals. When doing so its color is blue, gray, black, or variously colorful. The Drak usually transports grain in an eggshell or a nutshell. Sometimes it carries so much that it has to throw away a part of its load during its flight. The Drak often appears as a wet or freezing chicken at the wayside. If someone takes it home for it to warm at the fireplace, it will bring cereals to show its gratitude.

The third type is the Butterdrache (butter dragon), Milchdrache (milk dragon) or Quarkdrache (quark dragon). Accordingly, this Drak brings its owner milk or dairy goods, among them cheese and quark but never the good one. The milk might look like cherry stones, though. It might even bring all ingredients needed to bake a cake, e.g. cream, butter, and raisins. It sucks other people's cows dry so that they only give blood instead of milk. In the shape of a squirrel it sits on a cow when the cattle get milked. Stealing butter is rather difficult for the Drak, as it needs to visit a hundred villages to gather a spoonful of butter. The same can also be true for milk, for it will take one "Nödel" (measurement? spoon?) of milk per house in a hundred villages. The Drak brings other goods too, such as wood lugs turning into smoked beef, sausages (accordingly it is called Wurstdrache or sausage dragon), bread, flour and eggs, linen, dung, and frogs which can be used to make chicken soup. It only readily unloads its gifts if there is nobody else looking, though, and also guards its owner's goods. Hence, it will disappear if eavesdropped on. The Wurstdrache is offered milk containing chunks of bread roll for its services.

In the guise of a black dog, the Drak vomits dumplings. The Drak can also vomit milk. As a black cat, it defecates knöpfle, a type of Southern German noodle dish. Only that the knöpfle are cat dirt in reality. The toad-shaped Knöpflekröte (knöpfle toad), too, poops knöpfle. The Drak is milked through a thread.

There is further differentiation between a guter Drache (good dragon) and a armer Drache (poor dragon). The former enters the chimney as a fireball and pours out milk, eggs, and money. The latter appears as a long boom, enters through the window's pendentive and leaves behind a gruesome stench.

 Driving the Drak away 
Other people can drive the Drak away or force it to part with its load by swearing (e.g. "Schwinsdreck!" = "pig dirt!"), calling it by its name, calling at it through a wheel hub, or shouting commandos such as "Halbpart!" ("half part!") "Schütte, schütte!" ("Pour out, pour out!"), "Losch loh!" ("Let go!" in Silesian dialect = "Lass los!" in Standard German). Reciting the rhyme "Es fährt kein Fuhrmann über Land und Brück', Er lässet seinen Zoll zurück!" ("No teamster drives overland and over bridges, He leaves behind his toll!") has the same effect, as has showing one's naked behind, and shooting or throwing at the Drak, best with inherited silver, iron, or steel. Yet another method is pulling off a wheel from a wagon and putting it back on inverted. But one shouldn't stand directly beneath the Drak and flee under a roof as otherwise it will throw down a load of lice or filth, or sulfur stench which will never go away. A yellow sulfuric smelling substance left behind by the Drak is called Drachenschmalz (dragon lard)  or Drachengspei (dragon spit). This is the load the Drak had to drop because it flew over manure or tan, thought to be yellow, pungent milk. Otherwise it might also enter the house of its owner, setting it on fire and burning itself to death.

 Literature 
 Ludwig Bechstein: Deutsches Sagenbuch. Meiningen 1852. (reprint: F. W. Hendel Verlag, Meersburg/Leipzig 1930.)
 Eckstein: Butter. In: Hanns Bächtold-Stäubli, Eduard Hoffmann-Krayer: Handwörterbuch des Deutschen Aberglaubens: Band 1 Aal-Butzemann. Berlin 1927. (reprint: Walter de Gruyter, Berlin/New York 2000)
 Eckstein: Ei. In: Hanns Bächtold-Stäubli, Eduard Hoffmann-Krayer: Handwörterbuch des Deutschen Aberglaubens: Band 2 C.M.B.-Frautragen. Berlin 1930. (reprint: Walter de Gruyter, Berlin/New York 2000)
 Eckstein: Kuchen. In: Hanns Bächtold-Stäubli, Eduard Hoffmann-Krayer: Handwörterbuch des Deutschen Aberglaubens: Band 5 Knoblauch-Matthias. Berlin 1933. (reprint: Walter de Gruyter, Berlin/New York 2000)
 Eckstein: Milch. In: Hanns Bächtold-Stäubli, Eduard Hoffmann-Krayer: Handwörterbuch des Deutschen Aberglaubens: Band 6 Mauer-Pflugbrot. Berlin 1935. (reprint: Walter de Gruyter, Berlin/New York 2000)
 Eckstein: Milchhexe. In: Hanns Bächtold-Stäubli, Eduard Hoffmann-Krayer: Handwörterbuch des Deutschen Aberglaubens: Band 6 Mauer-Pflugbrot. Berlin 1935. (reprint: Walter de Gruyter, Berlin/New York 2000)
 Eckstein: Rahm. In: Hanns Bächtold-Stäubli, Eduard Hoffmann-Krayer: Handwörterbuch des Deutschen Aberglaubens: Band 7 Pflügen-Signatur. Berlin 1936. (reprint: Walter de Gruyter, Berlin/New York 2000)
 Freudenthal: glühend. In: Hanns Bächtold-Stäubli, Eduard Hoffmann-Krayer: Handwörterbuch des Deutschen Aberglaubens: Band 3 Freen-Hexenschuss. Berlin 1931. (reprint: Walter de Gruyter, Berlin/New York 2000)
 Heckscher: Dünger. In: Hanns Bächtold-Stäubli, Eduard Hoffmann-Krayer: Handwörterbuch des Deutschen Aberglaubens: Band 2 C.M.B.-Frautragen. Berlin 1930. (reprint: Walter de Gruyter, Berlin/New York 2000)
 Herold: Eichhörnchen. In: Hanns Bächtold-Stäubli, Eduard Hoffmann-Krayer: Handwörterbuch des Deutschen Aberglaubens: Band 2 C.M.B.-Frautragen. Berlin 1930. (reprint: Walter de Gruyter, Berlin/New York 2000)
 Hoffmann-Krayer: Dohle. In: Hanns Bächtold-Stäubli, Eduard Hoffmann-Krayer: Handwörterbuch des Deutschen Aberglaubens: Band 2 C.M.B.-Frautragen. Berlin 1930. (reprint: Walter de Gruyter, Berlin/New York 2000)
 Jungwirth: Kobold. In: Hanns Bächtold-Stäubli, Eduard Hoffmann-Krayer: Handwörterbuch des Deutschen Aberglaubens: Band 5 Knoblauch-Matthias. Berlin 1933. (reprint: Walter de Gruyter, Berlin/New York 2000)
 Künzig: Klöße, Knödel. In: Hanns Bächtold-Stäubli, Eduard Hoffmann-Krayer: Handwörterbuch des Deutschen Aberglaubens: Band 4 Hieb- und stichfest-Knistern. Berlin 1932. (reprint: Walter de Gruyter, Berlin/New York 2000)
 Lincke: Nachtjagd, -jäger. In: Hanns Bächtold-Stäubli, Eduard Hoffmann-Krayer: Handwörterbuch des Deutschen Aberglaubens: Band 6 Mauer-Pflugbrot. Berlin 1935. (reprint: Walter de Gruyter, Berlin/New York 2000)
 Mackensen: Drache. In: Hanns Bächtold-Stäubli, Eduard Hoffmann-Krayer: Handwörterbuch des Deutschen Aberglaubens: Band 2 C.M.B.-Frautragen. Berlin 1930. (reprint: Walter de Gruyter, Berlin/New York 2000)
 Mengis: rot. In: Hanns Bächtold-Stäubli, Eduard Hoffmann-Krayer: Handwörterbuch des Deutschen Aberglaubens: Band 7 Pflügen-Signatur. Berlin 1936. (reprint: Walter de Gruyter, Berlin/New York 2000)
 Olbrich: Schwefel. In: Hanns Bächtold-Stäubli, Eduard Hoffmann-Krayer: Handwörterbuch des Deutschen Aberglaubens: Band 7 Pflügen-Signatur. Berlin 1936. (reprint: Walter de Gruyter, Berlin/New York 2000)
 Riegler: Hase. In: Hanns Bächtold-Stäubli, Eduard Hoffmann-Krayer: Handwörterbuch des Deutschen Aberglaubens: Band 3 Freen-Hexenschuss. Berlin 1931. (reprint: Walter de Gruyter, Berlin/New York 2000)
 Tiemann: Rad. In: Hanns Bächtold-Stäubli, Eduard Hoffmann-Krayer: Handwörterbuch des Deutschen Aberglaubens: Band 7 Pflügen-Signatur. Berlin 1936. (reprint: Walter de Gruyter, Berlin/New York 2000)
 von Geramb: Ofen. In: Hanns Bächtold-Stäubli, Eduard Hoffmann-Krayer: Handwörterbuch des Deutschen Aberglaubens: Band 6 Mauer-Pflugbrot''. Berlin 1935. (reprint: Walter de Gruyter, Berlin/New York 2000)

References 

German legendary creatures
Demons
Deal with the Devil